Budhi Mai is a village in the Vaishali district, Bihar, India. It is a tourist destination with a rich a cultural and of historical heritage, and is a place of worship. The Budhi Mai Temple is situated in Vaishali, Haruli, Ismailpur, near the State Bank of India, Lalganj Road, Vaishali. Budhi Mai Fair/Mela ) is held in the month of July and August on Budhi Mai Campus, attracting visitors from all over Bihar.

References 

Hindu temples in Bihar